Mac Maurice Wilkins (born November 15, 1950) is an American athlete, who competed mainly in the discus throw. He was born in Eugene, Oregon and graduated in 1969 from Beaverton High School in Beaverton, Oregon.

College
Distance running coach Bill Bowerman recruited Wilkins to the University of Oregon, where he threw the javelin 257' 8" (78.43m)  as a 19-year-old freshman.  As a senior, he was NCAA champion in the discus and won the first of eight U.S. national championships in the discus.  He was inducted into the Oregon Sports Hall of Fame in 1994.

Olympics
Wilkins competed for the United States in the 1976 Summer Olympics in Montreal, Quebec, Canada in the discus throw, where he won the gold medal with a distance of 221' 5" to defeat Wolfgang Schmidt of East Germany by four feet. Wilkins qualified for the 1980 U.S. Olympic team but did not compete due to the 1980 Summer Olympics boycott. He did however receive one of 461 Congressional Gold Medals created especially for the spurned athletes.

Wilkins won a silver medal in the discus throw at the 1984 Summer Olympics held in Los Angeles. He placed 5th in the 1988 Olympic Games in Seoul, Korea.

World records
Wilkins broke the world record four times in his career. During his discus throw series on May 1, 1976 in San Jose, California, he set the world record three times with consecutive throws of 69.80 m, 70.24 m, and 70.86 m. In 1976 and 1980, Wilkins was ranked #1 in the world in the discus throw.  In 1977, he was the indoor national champion in the shot put, with a throw of  69' 1.5" (21.06 m).

Coaching
From 2006 thru 2013, Wilkins was the throws coach at Concordia University, an NAIA school in Portland, Oregon. His throwers won 26 individual national championships and earned 94 All-American honors. When Al Oerter died on 1 October 2007, Wilkins became the earliest surviving Olympic champion in the men's discus. He is not the oldest; Viktor Rashchupkin—the 1980 champion—is almost a month older. In August 2013, Wilkins left Concordia University to coach for USATF in Chula Vista, California.

References

External links
 Wilkins at the 1976 US. Olympic Trials  @ 30:55

American male discus throwers
Olympic gold medalists for the United States in track and field
Olympic silver medalists for the United States in track and field
Athletes (track and field) at the 1976 Summer Olympics
Athletes (track and field) at the 1984 Summer Olympics
Athletes (track and field) at the 1988 Summer Olympics
Athletes (track and field) at the 1979 Pan American Games
Oregon Ducks men's track and field athletes
Track and field athletes from Oregon
World record setters in athletics (track and field)
Concordia University (Oregon)
1950 births
Living people
Track and field athletes from California
Track and field athletes from San Jose, California
Medalists at the 1984 Summer Olympics
Medalists at the 1976 Summer Olympics
Pan American Games gold medalists for the United States
Pan American Games medalists in athletics (track and field)
Congressional Gold Medal recipients
Beaverton High School alumni
Medalists at the 1979 Pan American Games